Natividade da Serra (meaning "the nativity of the mountain") is a municipality in the state of São Paulo in Brazil. It is part of the Metropolitan Region of Vale do Paraíba e Litoral Norte. The population is 6,642 (2020 est.) in an area of 833.37 km². The elevation is 720 m. The southern part is heavily forested and mountainous and there are few roads and tracks into the mountain. The hills and some mountains with farmlands dominate the rest of the municipality.

The municipality contains part of the  Mananciais do Rio Paraíba do Sul Environmental Protection Area, created in 1982 to protect the sources of the Paraíba do Sul river.

References

External links
  Official site
  citybrazil.com.br
  Natividade da Serra on Explorevale

Municipalities in São Paulo (state)